The Real Housewives of Atlanta is an American reality television series that debuted October 7, 2008, and airs on Bravo. It is the third installment of The Real Housewives franchise with a peach serving as a symbol for the series, as the state of Georgia is a renowned peach growing area and one of the well-known streets in Atlanta is known as Peachtree Street. The Real Housewives of Atlanta is one of the highest-rated installments of the franchise as well as one of the most-watched series on the Bravo network. The series' fourteenth season chronicles six women in Atlanta— Shereé Whitfield, Kandi Burruss, Kenya Moore, Drew Sidora, Marlo Hampton, and Sanya Richards-Ross—as they balance their personal and business lives, along with their social circle.

Former cast members featured over the previous thirteen seasons are: NeNe Leakes (1-7, 10-12), DeShawn Snow (1), Lisa Wu  (1-2), Kim Zolciak-Biermann (1-5), Cynthia Bailey (3-13), Phaedra Parks (3-9), Porsha Williams (5-6, 8-13), Claudia Jordan (7), Kim Fields (8), Eva Marcille (11-12), and Shamari DeVoe (11).

Overview

Episodes

Season 1 (2008)

NeNe Leakes, DeShawn Snow, Shereé Whitfield, Lisa Wu, and Kim Zolciak-Biermann are introduced as series regulars.

Season 2 (2009)

Snow departed as a series regular. Kandi Burruss joined the cast.

Season 3 (2010–11)

Wu departed as a series regular. Cynthia Bailey and Phaedra Parks joined the cast.

Season 4 (2011–12)

Marlo Hampton served in a recurring capacity.

Season 5 (2012–13)

Whitfield departed as a series regular. Zolciak-Biermann departed as a series regular after episode 6. Kenya Moore and Porsha Williams (then Stewart) joined the cast.

Season 6 (2013–14)

Season 7 (2014–15)

Williams departed as a series regular, whilst serving in a recurring capacity. Claudia Jordan joined the cast. Demetria McKinney also served in a recurring capacity.

Season 8 (2015–16)

Leakes and Jordan departed as series regulars. Williams rejoined the cast as a series regular. Kim Fields joined the cast. Whitfield and Shamea Morton served in recurring capacities.

Season 9 (2016–17) 

Fields departed as a series regular. Whitfield rejoined the cast as a series regular.

Season 10 (2017–18) 

Parks departed as a series regular. Leakes rejoined the cast as a series regular. Zolciak-Biermann, Hampton and Eva Marcille served in recurring capacities.

Season 11 (2018–19) 

Whitfield and Moore departed as series regulars. Marcille and Shamari DeVoe joined the cast. Hampton and Tanya Sam served in recurring capacities.

Season 12 (2019–20) 

DeVoe departed as a series regular. Moore rejoined the cast as a series regular. Hampton and Sam served in recurring capacities.

Season 13 (2020–21)

Leakes and Marcille departed as series regulars. Drew Sidora joined the cast. Hampton, Sam and LaToya Ali served in recurring capacities.

Season 14 (2022)

Bailey and Williams departed as series regulars. Whitfield rejoined the cast as a series regular. Hampton and Sanya Richards-Ross joined the cast. Monyetta Shaw-Carter served in a recurring capacity.

References

General references

External links
 

Real Housewives of Atlanta
Atlanta Episodes